Lupicinus of Lyon was the first Archbishop of Lyon (491–494) Bishop of Lyon. His feast day is 3 February.

References

5th-century Frankish bishops
Archbishops of Lyon
5th-century Christian saints
5th-century Gallo-Roman people

Year of birth unknown
Year of death missing